Curtis John Cregan (born January 18, 1977) is an American actor, singer, and dancer. Cregan appeared in the American version of the Australian children's television show Hi-5, and also appeared in 2013's The Lone Ranger.

Early life
Cregan was born in Vintage, Pennsylvania and raised in Okemos, Michigan, where he attended Okemos High School. He studied with choral director Frank K. DeWald. He attended the University of Cincinnati College-Conservatory of Music.

Career
His first performing job was as an emcee for the Nickelodeon show at Kings Island. After college, he made his Broadway debut in Rent. From there, he went on to play such roles as Doody from Grease, Dickon from The Secret Garden and one of the Von Trapp Family from The Sound of Music.

In 2003, he joined the American version of the Australian children's television show Hi-5. His role is similar to that of Tim Harding, Tim Maddren and Joe Kalou's in the original Australian version. In the series, his segment is "Making Music", where he explains the fundamentals of music and making musical instruments from everyday objects. Cregan also provides the voice of Kimee Balmilero's mischief-making friend Jup-Jup. Cregan first appeared in 2013's The Lone Ranger.

Curtis married Broadway actress Jenn Gambatese on June 30, 2007.

They have one child, a daughter, born 2009.

References

External links
 
 Hi-5 US Website

American male television actors
American children's musicians
1977 births
Living people
People from Okemos, Michigan